Tincan Experiment is the first album by the American band 6gig. It was released in 2000 by Ultimatum Music.

Production
The album was recorded at Long View Farm Studios, in Massachusetts. It was produced by Roger Sommers.

Critical reception
AllMusic wrote that "the visceral drive is there, but there's little substance to tunes like '5' and 'Method' to give it staying power." The Telegram & Gazette called the album "a confident, hard-hitting combination of bombast and melodicism." The Vancouver Sun wrote: "Weirdly enough for such a young crew of ambitious rockers, there's a plodding, lifelessness at work here." The Providence Journal wrote that "the band's diversity of styles can hamper the effort when no prevailing sound emerges ... But all the variety has its rewards."

Track listing
 Method
 Hit the Ground
 5
 Junk, Puppet, Paperclip
 Tincan Experiment
 Yesterday
 Talkshow
 Gasoline Trail
 Built For It
 Klones
 Bagmask
 Willie

Album credits
 Mastering – George Marino
 Producer, Engineer, Mixing – Roger Sommers
 Art Direction, Design, Photography – Walter Craven
 Producer, Engineer – Spencer Albee
 Management – Bill Beasley
 Violin, String Arrangements – Eric Gorfain
 Engineer – John Wyman, Jim Begley
 Violin – Roland Hartwell
 Producer, Main Performer – 6Gig
 Assistant Engineer  – Chris Wonzer
 Engineer, Editing – Curt Kroeger
 Viola – Piotr Jandula
 Management – T.J. McNaboe
 Photography – Becky Neiman
 Assistant Engineer – Joe Brien
 Cello – Richard Dodd

References

2000 albums